Grande Prairie Airport  is a commercial airport located  west northwest of Grande Prairie, Alberta, Canada. It is the largest airport in the Peace River Country of northwestern Alberta and northeastern British Columbia, having served 446,000 passengers in 2014 and 436,000 in 2015, ranking among the busiest regional airports in Canada.

The airport has seen passenger traffic growth due to the economic and population growth of the city. The terminal, originally built in 1981, has undergone extensive renovations which increased space, added a restaurant to the second floor, expanded the terminal to the south and added parking space. Further expansion added another gate, baggage carousel, and office space for customs use.

The airport is served by regional air carriers Air Canada Express and WestJet Encore, each with propjet flights to Edmonton and Calgary, as well as by low-cost airline Flair Airlines. The airport also sees charter traffic and additional traffic caused by the high density oil and gas industry in the area. The airport also serves the Royal Canadian Air Cadets Peace Region Gliding Program, who fly the Schweizer 2-33A glider off a winch launch set up.

Airlines and destinations

Historical airline service

Canadian Pacific Air Lines and its successors CP Air and Canadian Airlines International served Grande Prairie for many years.  Canadian Pacific commenced service to Grande Prairie in the early 1940s.  During the 1970s and 1980s, CP Air flew Boeing 737-200 aircraft into the airport with flights to Edmonton, Vancouver, Prince George, Fort St. John, Fort Nelson, and Whitehorse. Time Air, an Alberta-based regional airline, also served Grande Prairie during the 1970s with de Havilland Canada DHC-6 Twin Otter turboprop flights to Edmonton, Calgary and Red Deer.

References

External links
Grande Prairie Airport

Page about this airport  on COPA's Places to Fly airport directory

Certified airports in Alberta
Grande Prairie
Airfields of the United States Army Air Forces Air Transport Command in Alaska
Airfields of the United States Army Air Forces in Canada